is a  global confectionery company in Tokyo, Japan, in operation since 1899. Their products include candy and other confectioneries. Morinaga has had Ayumi Hamasaki and Mao Asada appear in their commercials, and in the past has used stars such as the Carpenters to advertise their products.

In 1960, the company advertised that women should give chocolates to men on Valentine's Day. This action strongly influenced the present culture of Valentine's Day in Japan. Moreover, in 2009, the company made chocolates for men to give women, which are called Gyaku-choco. (Gyaku means reverse in Japanese.)

Affiliate company
Morinaga Milk Industry Co., Ltd.

See also

Glico Morinaga case
Marie biscuit
Hi-Chew

References

External links

 Morinaga & Company
 Morinaga & Company corporate profile

 
Food and drink companies based in Tokyo
Japanese brands
Food and drink companies established in 1899
Japanese companies established in 1899
Companies listed on the Tokyo Stock Exchange
Japanese brand foods
Confectionery companies of Japan
1940s initial public offerings